Róbert Polievka (born 9 June 1996) is a Slovak footballer who plays as a forward for Dukla Banská Bystrica in the Fortuna Liga.

Club career

FK Dukla Banská Bystrica
He made his professional debut for Banská Bystrica against Košice on 12 July 2014.

FC DAC 1904 Dunajská Streda
On 20 June 2015, he signed a three-year contract with Dunajská Streda.

References

External links
 
 Futbalnet profile
 Eurofotbal profile

1996 births
Living people
Sportspeople from Krupina
Slovak footballers
Slovakia youth international footballers
Slovakia under-21 international footballers
Association football forwards
FK Dukla Banská Bystrica players
FC DAC 1904 Dunajská Streda players
FK Železiarne Podbrezová players
MŠK Žilina players
Slovak Super Liga players
2. Liga (Slovakia) players